Buddha's Lost Children is a 2006 documentary film by Dutch director Mark Verkerk. The feature film tells the story of Khru Bah Neua Chai Kositto, a Buddhist monk who has dedicated his life to orphaned children in the Golden Triangle area of Thailand. The film opened in Dutch cinemas in September 2006.

Awards
The film won the International Documentary Grand Jury Prize (2006) at the Los Angeles AFI Fest, the Jury Award for Documentary (2007) at the Newport Beach Film Festival, the Best Global Insight Film (2007) at the Jackson Hole Film Festival , the David L. Wolper Best Documentary Award (2007) at the Napa Sonoma Valley Film Festival , the City of Rome Award (2006) at the Asiaticafilmmediale  in Rome, the Crystal Film (2006) at the Netherlands Film Festival, and the Silver Dove (2006) at the Dok Leipzig.

References

External links
 

2006 films
Thai-language films
Documentary films about Buddhism
Dutch documentary films
Documentary films about orphanages
2006 documentary films